Odd-Bjørn Hjelmeset (born 6 December 1971 in Nordfjordeid) is a Norwegian former cross-country skier who competed from 1993 to 2012.

A classical technique specialist, Hjelmeset's biggest success is the gold medal in the 50 km event at the FIS Nordic World Ski Championships 2007 in Sapporo. At the FIS Nordic World Ski Championships he won eight medals (all in the classical style). This includes five gold medals (50 km: 2007, 4 × 10 km relay: 2001, 2005, 2007, 2009) and three bronze medals (1999: 10 km, 2001: 15 km, and 2005: 50 km).

Hjelmeset has also competed on the national level in athletics, and won the bronze medal at the Norwegian championships in the 3000 metre steeplechase in 1996 and 1999.

The 2007 season was Hjelmeset's best. He won two gold medals at the World Championships in Sapporo, then a World Cup race in Lahti, before winning the 50 km individual start in Holmenkollen where he had won the sprint event in 2000. Hjelmeset was awarded the Holmenkollen medal in 2007 (Shared with Frode Estil, King Harald V, and Queen Sonja).

He retired after he failed to qualify for the 2011 Nordic World Ski Championships in Oslo. He last World Cup race was the 50 kilometre at the 2012 Holmenkollen Ski Festival, where he finished 52nd.

Cross-country skiing results
All results are sourced from the International Ski Federation (FIS).

Olympic Games
 2 medals – (1 silver, 1 bronze)

World Championships
 8 medals – (5 gold, 3 bronze)

World Cup

Season standings

Individual podiums
 9 victories (8 , 1 )
 21 podiums (19 , 2 )

Note:  Until the 1999 World Championships, World Championship races were included in the World Cup scoring system.

Team podiums
 8 victories (8 ) 
 17 podiums (16 , 1 )

References

External links

 2007 Holmenkollen medalists announced – Accessed March 18, 2007. 
 
 Holmenkollen medal presented to Estil and Hjelmeset – Accessed March 21, 2007 
 Holmenkollen winners since 1892 – click Vinnere for downloadable pdf file 

1971 births
Living people
Cross-country skiers at the 2002 Winter Olympics
Cross-country skiers at the 2006 Winter Olympics
Cross-country skiers at the 2010 Winter Olympics
Holmenkollen medalists
Holmenkollen Ski Festival winners
Norwegian male long-distance runners
Norwegian male cross-country skiers
Norwegian male steeplechase runners
Olympic cross-country skiers of Norway
Olympic bronze medalists for Norway
Olympic silver medalists for Norway
Olympic medalists in cross-country skiing
People from Gloppen
FIS Nordic World Ski Championships medalists in cross-country skiing
Medalists at the 2010 Winter Olympics
Medalists at the 2002 Winter Olympics
Sportspeople from Vestland
21st-century Norwegian people